Livingston is the parish seat of Livingston Parish, Louisiana, United States. The population was 1,769 at the 2010 census.
 
Livingston hosts one of the two LIGO gravitational wave detector sites, the other one being located in Hanford, Washington.

History

Like the parish, Livingston takes its name from the jurist Edward Livingston.

Livingston was the site of a major train derailment (spilling about 200,000 gallons of chemicals) in 1982.

On February 11 of 2016, it was officially announced that the LIGO collaboration successfully made the first direct observation of gravitational waves in September 2015. Barry Barish, Kip Thorne and Rainer Weiss were awarded the 2017 Nobel Prize in Physics for leading this work.

Geography
Livingston is located at  (30.498721, -90.748371).

The communities of Doyle and Livingston, combined in 1955 to create the Town of Livingston.  Doyle was established northeast of present-day Livingston, located on Hog Branch, off present-day North Doyle Road but moved when the railroad was built from Baton Rouge to Hammond, and the community was re-located in 1901 by the McDonald family.

Livingston was started by the Lyons Lumber Company in 1916 as a logging community on 63 acres just west of Doyle, to support their logging industry and timber mill in Garyville, located south of Livingston on the Mississippi River. Therefore, Livingston and Garyville are sister cities.

When Livingston was first established there was a house on every lot, a board walk in front of every home, and water wells drilled on each corner so every home would have access to running water.

Demographics

As of the 2020 United States census, there were 1,877 people, 679 households, and 492 families residing in the town.

As of the census of 2000, there were 1,342 people, 539 households, and 377 families residing in the town. The racial makeup of the town was 96.05% White, 2.98% African American, 0.07% Native American, 0.22% Asian, and 0.67% from two or more races. Hispanic or Latino of any race were 0.52% of the population.

There were 539 households, out of which 34.3% had children under the age of 18 living with them, 49.9% were married couples living together, 15.0% had a female householder with no husband present, and 29.9% were non-families. 25.6% of all households were made up of individuals, and 11.9% had someone living alone who was 65 years of age or older. The average household size was 2.49 and the average family size was 3.00.

In the town, the population was spread out, with 26.1% under the age of 18, 11.2% from 18 to 24, 27.0% from 25 to 44, 23.9% from 45 to 64, and 11.8% who were 65 years of age or older. The median age was 35 years. For every 100 females, there were 95.3 males. For every 100 females age 18 and over, there were 87.9 males.

The median income for a household in the town was $32,813, and the median income for a family was $41,625. Males had a median income of $33,958 versus $20,795 for females. The per capita income for the town was $15,075. About 10.9% of families and 12.9% of the population were below the poverty line, including 7.7% of those under age 18 and 21.4% of those age 65 or over.

Education
Livingston is within the Livingston Parish Public Schools system.

The following schools serve the Town of Livingston and the local area:
 Doyle Elementary School
 Doyle High School
 Frost Elementary (South of the Town of Livingston, serving the Frost Community)

Notable people

Dale M. Erdey, current state senator from Livingston Parish and former mayor of Livingston. His father was also a mayor of Livingston.
Heulette Fontenot, former state representative and state senator from Livingston Parish
Gabriela González, spokesperson for the LIGO Scientific Collaboration
Laine Hardy, American Idol contestant 2018; American Idol winner 2019

References

Towns in Livingston Parish, Louisiana
Towns in Louisiana
Parish seats in Louisiana
Baton Rouge metropolitan area
Gravitational-wave astronomy